The Orgyiini are a tribe of tussock moths of the family Erebidae. The tribe was described by Wallengren in 1861.

Description
Caterpillars of the group have brushes of hairs on the top of abdominal segments 1 (adjacent to the thorax), 2, 3, 4, and 8 and pencils of hairs projected forward from the sides of the head.

Genera
The tribe includes the following genera.  This list may be incomplete.

Acyphas
Aroa
Belinda
Calliteara
Casama
Cifuna
Clethrogyna
Dasychira
Dicallomera
Eudasychira
Griveaudyria
Gynaephora
Habrophylla
Hemerophanes
Ilema
Laelia
Mpanjaka
Mylantria
Neomardara
Ocneria
Olene
Orgyia
Pantana
Penthophera
Psalis
Teia
Telochurus
Varatra

References

Lymantriinae
Moth tribes